Parit Bakar is a small town in Muar District, Johor, Malaysia. It is subdivided to "Parit Bakar Darat" and " Parit Bakar Laut". Parit Bakar Laut is 1 km towards the coastline from Parit Bakar town centre.

The centre of the township consists of a Chinese primary school, Chi Sin Primary School, a Chinese temple, Long Shan Yan Temple (龙山岩), and a few rows of shop.

At the junction of Jalan Abdul Rahman and Jalan Parit Bakar, is the new Parit Bakar Mosque, which was rebuilt in 2004. Its roof, which resembles a pagoda instead of the usual dome, is similar to the historic Tranquerah Mosque in Malacca.

Geography
The town spans over an area of 40 km2.

Economy
The main industries of the town are small and medium enterprises.

Transportation
Parit Bakar can be reached by travelling along Jalan Temenggung Ahmad (Temenggung Ahmad Road) for 10 minutes from Muar.

References

Towns in Johor
Towns, suburbs and villages in Muar
Muar District